The 102nd Regiment of Foot was a regiment of the British Army between 1781 and 1785.

History 
The regiment was raised in 1781.  The regiment fought in India during the Second Anglo-Mysore War and lost its king's colour and regimental colour on 3 May 1783 during the Siege of Bednore when the fortress fell to Mysore forces.
  The regiment was disbanded in 1785.

References 

Infantry regiments of the British Army
Military units and formations established in 1781
Military units and formations disestablished in 1785
1781 establishments in Great Britain
1785 disestablishments in Great Britain